Sing-sing is a gathering of a few tribes or villages in Papua New Guinea. People arrive to show their distinct culture, dance and music. The aim of these gatherings is to peacefully share traditions as each Islands have their own dance. Villagers paint and decorate themselves for sing-sings which they have only once a year.

See also
Goroka Show, famous annual tribal gathering
Mount Hagen
List of festivals in Papua New Guinea
List of folk festivals
Pow wow

External links
Photos from Goroka Show – 1957 and 1958
Other sing-sings

Cultural festivals in Papua New Guinea
Dance festivals in Papua New Guinea
Music festivals in Papua New Guinea
Folk festivals in Papua New Guinea
Festivals in Papua New Guinea